Stollen ( or ) is a fruit bread of nuts, spices, and dried or candied fruit, coated with powdered sugar or icing sugar and often containing marzipan. It is a traditional German Christmas bread. During the Christmas season the cake-like loaves are called Weihnachtsstollen (after "Weihnachten", the German word for Christmas) or Christstollen (after Christ).

Ingredients 
Stollen is a cake-like fruit bread made with yeast, water and flour, and usually with zest added to the dough. Orangeat (candied orange peel) and candied citrus peel (Zitronat), raisins and almonds, and various spices such as cardamom and cinnamon are added. Other ingredients, such as milk, sugar, butter, salt, rum, eggs, vanilla, other dried fruits and nuts and marzipan, may also be added to the dough. Except for the fruit added, the dough is quite low in sugar. The finished bread is sprinkled with icing sugar. The bread is slathered with melted unsalted butter and rolled in sugar as soon as it comes out of the oven, resulting in a moister product that keeps better. The marzipan rope in the middle is optional. The dried fruits are macerated in rum or brandy for a superior-tasting bread.

Dresden Stollen (originally Striezel), a moist, heavy bread filled with fruit, was first mentioned in an official document in 1474, and Dresdner Stollen remains notable and available – amongst other places – at the Dresden Christmas market, the Striezelmarkt. Dresden Stollen is produced in the city of Dresden and distinguished by a special seal depicting King Augustus II the Strong. This "official" stollen is produced in only 110 Dresden bakeries.

History

Early stollen was different from the modern version, with the ingredients being flour, oats and water. As a Christmas bread, stollen was baked for the first time at the Council of Trent in 1545, and was made with flour, yeast, oil and water.

The Advent season was a time of fasting, and bakers were not allowed to use butter, only oil, and the cake was tasteless and hard. In the 15th century, in medieval Saxony (in central Germany, north of Bavaria and south of Brandenburg), the Prince Elector Ernst (1441–1486) and his brother Duke Albrecht (1443–1500) decided to remedy this by writing to the Pope in Rome. The Saxon bakers needed to use butter, as oil in Saxony was expensive, hard to come by, and had to be made from turnips.

Pope Nicholas V (1397–1455), in 1450 denied the first appeal. Five popes died before finally, in 1490, Pope Innocent VIII (1432–1492) sent a letter, known as the "Butter-Letter", to the prince's successor. This granted the use of butter (without having to pay a fine), but only for the Prince-Elector and his family and household.

Others were also permitted to use butter, but on the condition of having to pay annually 1/20 of a gold coin Gulden to support the building of the Freiberg Minster. The papal restriction on the use of butter was removed when Saxony became Protestant.

Over the centuries, the bread changed from being a simple, fairly tasteless "bread" to a sweeter bread with richer ingredients, such as marzipan, although traditional Stollen is not as sweet, light, and airy as the copies made around the world.

In the GDR, Dresdner Stollen were sent to West Germany as a way of thanking the citizens of West Germany for sending care packets (Westpaket), as they were both available to the GDR citizens and of a high enough standard to be appreciated as gifts.

Commercially made stollen has become a popular Christmas food in Britain in recent decades, complementing traditional dishes such as mince pies and Christmas pudding. All the major supermarkets sell their own versions, many made in Germany, and it is often baked by home bakers.

Dresden Stollen festival

Every year the Stollenfest takes place in Dresden. This historical tradition ended only in 1918 with the fall of the monarchy, and started again in 1994, but the idea comes from Dresden's history.

Dresden's Christmas market, the Striezelmarkt, was mentioned in the chronicles for the first time in 1474.

The tradition of baking Christmas stollen in Dresden is very old. Christmas stollen in Dresden was already baked in the 15th century.

In 1560, the bakers of Dresden offered the rulers of Saxony Christmas Stollen weighing  each as gift, and the custom continued.

Augustus II the Strong (1670–1733) was the Elector of Saxony, King of Poland and the Grand Duke of Lithuania. The king loved pomp, luxury, splendour and feasts. In 1730, he impressed his subjects, ordering the Bakers’ Guild of Dresden to make a giant 1.7-tonne stollen, big enough for everyone to have a portion to eat. There were around 24,000 guests taking part in the festivities on the occasion of the legendary amusement festivity known as Zeithainer Lustlager. For this special occasion, the court architect Matthäus Daniel Pöppelmann (1662–1737), built a particularly oversized Stollen oven. An oversized Stollen knife also had been designed solely for this occasion.

Today, the festival takes place on the Saturday before the second Sunday in Advent, and the cake weighs between three and four tonnes. A carriage takes the cake in a parade through the streets of Dresden to the Christmas market, where it is ceremoniously cut into pieces and distributed among the crowd, in return for a small payment which goes to charity.

Gallery

See also

Bremer Klaben
Christkindlmarkt
Christmas pudding
Christmas worldwide
Cuisine of Germany
Fruitcake
Julekake
Kerststol
Pan de pascua
Panettone
Striezelmarkt
Vánočka

References

External links

Dresden Stollen Festival
Dresden Stollen history, in English from the Germany Embassy in Canada

Sweet breads
Dresden
Christmas food
Christmas in Germany
German desserts
Saxon cuisine
German breads
Christian cuisine
Yeast cakes